This article lists acoustic recordings made for Columbia by Ferruccio Busoni. The published recordings were issued on 78-rpm records. It is believed that the original matrices were destroyed in a fire at the Columbia factory in England in the 1920s. Copies of the original 78s still exist, and the recordings have been transferred to LP and CD. Some of the digital copies have been computer enhanced.

List of acoustic recordings 
Table 1. Recordings from 18–19 November 1919 at Columbia Studios, London.The recordings from these earlier sessions were deemed unsatisfactory, were not issued, and are probably lost.

Table 2. Recordings from 27 February 1922 at Columbia Studios, London.

Selected CD reissue 
 Busoni and his Legacy: Piano recordings by Busoni • Ley • Petri
Arbiter 134 (CD; 72 min; ADD using "sonic depth technology"; issued 2002).
• Ferruccio Busoni (1866-1924): the complete 1922 recordings (L 1445, L 1470, L 1432, L 1456)
• Rosamond Ley (1882-1969):
• Liszt: Jeux d'eau a la Villa d'Este (rec. 1942)
• Liszt: Sonata après une lecture du Dante (rec. 1942)
• Egon Petri (1881-1962):
• Liszt: Totentanz (incomplete; first 78 missing; rec. 1936)
• Busoni: Piano Concerto, Movement 4 (recorded from a live broadcast 2 June 1932 with Hans Rosbaud, conductor)

Notes

References 
 Dyment, Christopher (1978). "Ferruccio Busoni: His Phonograph Recordings," ARSC Journal, 10:2/3, pp. 185-187. Accessed 7 July 2009.
 Roberge, Marc-André (1991). Ferruccio Busoni: a bio-bibliography. New York: Greenwood Press. 
 Sitsky, Larry (2008). Busoni and the Piano. The Works, the Writings, and the Recordings. (2nd ed.) Hillsdale, NY: Pendragon Press.  [First edition, Westport: Greenwood Press,1986. ]

Discographies of classical pianists
Discographies of Italian artists